Sexton Blake is a fictional detective who has been featured in many British comic strips, novels, and dramatic productions since 1893. He was featured in various British publications from 1893 to 1978 in a variety of formats: single-issue adventures, short stories, serials, and comic strips. In total, Blake appeared in more than 4,000 stories by over 200 different authors.
During its golden age (1920s-1940s), Blake's adventures were widely read and translated into at least twenty different languages, including Swedish, Norwegian, Finnish, Dutch, Spanish, German, Portuguese, Italian, French, Arabic, Hindi, and Afrikaans.

Publication History 
The first Sexton Blake story was "The Missing Millionaire". Written by Harry Blyth (using the pseudonym Hal Meredeth), it was published in The Halfpenny Marvel number 6, on 20 December 1893, a story paper owned by the Amalgamated Press. Blyth wrote six more Sexton Blake tales, three for the Marvel and three for The Union Jack a story paper launched in April 1894.

The Amalgamated Press purchased the copyright to Blake along with the first story Blyth had submitted and from 1895 onwards several authors began to pen Blake tales. From August 1905 Blake became the resident character in the The Union Jack, appearing in every issue until its transformation into the Detective Weekly in 1933.

Blake’s popularity began to grow during the Edwardian era, and he appeared in a number of different story papers. These appearances included serials in the tabloid sized Boys’ Friend, complete tales in the pocket-sized Penny Pictorial, and short stores in Answers, one of the Amalgamated Press’ most popular papers. Longer tales of 60,000 words or so appeared in The Boys’ Friend Library and the success of these led to the creation of The Sexton Blake Library in 1915. This digest-sized publication specialized in longer tales, and at the height of its popularity was published 5 times a month.It ran for just under 50 years. 

In 1959 Fleetway Publications acquired the rights to Sexton Blake adventures and published the The Sexton Blake Library until the title's demise. The final tale, The Last Tiger, was published in June 1963.

In 1965, Blake editor William Howard Baker licensed the rights of the Sexton Blake character. He published the fifth series of The Sexton Blake Library independently via Mayflower-Dell Books, which ran until 1968. He then issued a final series of four Sexton Blake novels, using his Howard Baker Books imprint, in 1969.
From 1968 to 1971 Valiant published new comic strips in the style of the Knockout strips from decades earlier.
Blake’s last original appearance was in Sexton Blake and the Demon God “a period thriller with ancient curses and cliff-hanger endings” in 1978.

There were a few anthologies and reprints in the 80s and 90s. In 2009 Wordsworth Books published the casebook of Sexton Blake and Snowbooks published Sexton Blake Detective. 2018 saw an uptick in Sexton Blake reprints, with the first print novels published by Stillwoods Publishing, a Canadian publisher out of Nova Scotia. In 2020 ROH Press began publishing Sexton Blake tales with Sexton Blake The Early Years, a collection of Blake's first cases. British publishers Rebellion Publishing produced four anthologies in 2020-21, each introduced by Blakeologist Mark Hodder.

Compiling the Sexton Blake Bibliography 
The bibliography originated in the pages of Story Paper Collectors' Digest where collectors began recording and compiling the list of Blake tales that appeared in the The Union Jack and The Sexton Blake Library. A master corpus was assembled in the late 1950s by The Sexton Blake Circle to facilitate the research of the Blake story papers.

Titles and authorship were verified from the archived records of the Amalgamated Press. As many of authors published in The Union Jack before 1929 were uncredited, the Sexton Blake Circle adopted the practice of accrediting authorship to the person who received payment for the tale until proven otherwise. Led by Len and Josie Packman expansion and revision on the master corpus was ongoing throughout the early 1960s as research brought more titles to light.

The Sexton Blake Catalogue was published in 1966. The announcement in Story Paper Collectors' Digest read:

In 1970 Josie Packman announced a reprint of the Sexton Blake Catalogue along with a "supplement of all the new information."

In July 1971 its completion and availability was announced in the Collector’s Digest with the following announcement:

Since publication the Catalogue and supplement have been considered an “invaluable” tool by researchers interested in the Blake canon. As Blake research was ongoing as new information or titles were discovered in primary sources, the catalogue was updated.

The catalogue provided verification that Sexton Blake had appeared in roughly 4000 tales by around 200 authors. Based on this statistic, Otto Penzler and Chris Steinbrunner writing in the Encyclopedia of Mystery and Detection, concluded that Sexton Blake was "the hero of more novels and stories than any other detective."

In 1993 the second edition of the “famous Sexton Blake Catalogue” was announced in honour of the detective’s 100th birthday. The announcement read:

It was issued by The Sexton Blake Library in Loughton, Essex.

Additions to the catalogue since 1993 have been made from publisher and retailer websites. ISBN numbers, where applicable, have been added to assist verification.

The Sexton Blake Bibliography Parts 1 to 4
Due to the extreme length of the bibliography it has been divided into four eras:

1893-1911: The Victorian/Edwardian Era Sexton Blake bibliography
1912-1945: The Master Criminals Era Sexton Blake bibliography part 2: 1912-1945 
1946-1978: The Post War Era Sexton Blake bibliography part 3: 1946-1978 
1979–present: Revivals and Republications: Sexton Blake bibliography part 4: 1979-present

Notes to the Cases 
All authors have been listed and linked to their Wikipedia biographies where possible. Many of these authors are remembered nowadays for the adversaries they pitted against Blake or the femme fatales they introduced. Many of these popular characters and their appearances have been described and included as well as key incidents in the life of Sexton Blake.

1893 The Amalgamated Press Era Begins

Sexton Blake's career began on 13 December 1893, the same month that Sherlock Holmes appeared in "The Final Solution". Blake was one of many detectives created in the 1890s to fill the void created by the tale Sir Arthur Conan Doyle intended to be the final Holmes story.

1894

1895

1896

1897

1898

1899

1900

1901

1902

1903

1904 

This year marks the beginning of what will become the Blake crime-fighting trio: Sexton Blake, his assistant Tinker and their bloodhound Pedro. Tinker makes his first appearance in 1904, Pedro follows just under a year later in 1905.

1905 

As can be seen by the title of these stories the early Edwardian phase of Blake's career consists of tales where he goes undercover in various jobs or travels overseas.

1906

1907

1908

1909

1910

1911

External links
 Blakiana, The Sexton Blake Resource
 The Sexton Blake Archive: Rebellion Publishing
 Sexton Blake Anthologies: ROH Press
 Issues of The Sexton Blake Library at ComicBooksPlus
 Sexton Blake: The World's Greatest Detective

References
 

Sexton Blake
Mystery fiction bibliographies
Sexton Blake